Reisz may refer to:

Albie Reisz, American professional football quarterback for the Cleveland Rams/Los Angeles Rams
Karel Reisz, Czech-born British filmmaker active in post–war Britain
Kristopher Reisz, American author known for his young adult novels
Mechel Reisz, Hungarian pioneer of Hassidism in France
Michael Reisz, American actor and voice actor
Robert R. Reisz, Canadian paleontologist
Mademoiselle Reisz, a main character in The Awakening, an 1899 novel by Kate Chopin

See also 
 Related surnames
 Riess, German surname
 Riesz, surname
 Ries (disambiguation), derived from the Arabic word rizma